Louis Lafon was a French photographer active between the 1870s and 1890s. He is noted for having photographed industrial scenes as well as landscapes involving man-made artifacts.

Work
The Metropolitan Museum of Art has written about Lafon, “He was based in Paris, photographed primarily industrial subjects, and won a medal for his submissions to the 1874 exhibition of the Société Française de Photographie.”

Lafon used the albumen print technique which produces a glossy surface on the images.

Lafon created a large scale (by 19th c. standards) photograph (now in the collection of Princeton University Library) of a high-speed printing press fabricated by Hippolyte Marinoni (Presse Universelle). The press revolutionized the mechanical reproduction industry.

Collections
Lafon's work is included in the collection of the Metropolitan Museum of Art, the National Gallery of Art, Washington, the Clark Art Institute,  and the Museum of Fine Arts Houston.

Gallery

References

19th-century French photographers
Landscape photographers
Date of birth unknown
Place of birth unknown